Adolf Wölfli (February 29, 1864 – November 6, 1930) (occasionally spelled Adolf Woelfli or Adolf Wolfli) was a Swiss artist who was one of the first artists to be associated with the Art Brut or outsider art label.

Early life
Wölfli was born in Bern. He was abused both physically and sexually as a child, and was orphaned at the age of 10. He thereafter grew up in a series of state-run foster homes. He worked as a Verdingbub (indentured child laborer) and briefly joined the army. He was charged with the attempted sexual abuse of minors and was sentenced to a prison term. In 1895, following another similar arrest, he was admitted to the Waldau Clinic, a psychiatric hospital in Bern where he would live out the rest of his life. He was very disturbed and sometimes violent upon admission, leading to him being kept in isolation during his early time at the hospital. He suffered from psychosis, which led to intense hallucinations.

Creative works
At some point after his admission Wölfli began to draw. His first surviving works (a series of 50 pencil drawings) are dated from between 1904 and 1906.

Walter Morgenthaler, a doctor at the Waldau Clinic, took a particular interest in Wölfli's art and his condition, later publishing Ein Geisteskranker als Künstler (A Psychiatric Patient as Artist) in 1921 which first brought Wölfli to the attention of the art world.

Morgenthaler's book detailed the works of a patient who seemed to have no previous interest in art and developed his talents and skills independently after being committed for a debilitating condition. In this respect, Wölfli was an iconoclast and influenced the development and acceptance of outsider art, Art Brut and its champion Jean Dubuffet.

Wölfli produced a huge number of works during his life, often working with the barest of materials and trading smaller works with visitors to the clinic to obtain pencils, paper or other essentials. Morgenthaler closely observed Wölfli's methods, writing in his influential book:

"Every Monday morning Wölfli is given a new pencil and two large sheets of unprinted newsprint. The pencil is used up in two days; then he has to make do with the stubs he has saved or with whatever he can beg off someone else. He often writes with pieces only five to seven millimetres long and even with the broken-off points of lead, which he handles deftly, holding them between his fingernails. He carefully collects packing paper and any other paper he can get from the guards and patients in his area; otherwise he would run out of paper before the next Sunday night. At Christmas the house gives him a box of coloured pencils, which lasts him two or three weeks at the most."

The images Wölfli produced were complex, intricate and intense. They worked to the very edges of the page with detailed borders. In a manifestation of Wölfli's "horror vacui", every empty space was filled with two small holes. Wölfli called the shapes around these holes his "birds".

His images also incorporated an idiosyncratic musical notation. This notation seemed to start as a purely decorative affair but later developed into real composition which Wölfli would play on a paper trumpet.

In 1908, he set about creating a semi-autobiographical epic which eventually stretched to 45 volumes, containing a total of over 25,000 pages and 1,600 illustrations. This work was a mix of elements of his own life blended with fantastical stories of his adventures from which he transformed himself from a child to 'Knight Adolf' to 'Emperor Adolf' and finally to 'St Adolf II'. Text and illustrations formed the narrative, sometimes combining multiple elements on kaleidoscopic pages of music, words and colour.

After Wölfli died at Waldau in 1930, his works were taken to the Museum of the Waldau Clinic in Bern. Later the Adolf Wölfli Foundation was formed to preserve his art for future generations. Its collection is now on display at the Museum of Fine Arts in Bern.

Music and audio recordings

Wölfli's work has inspired many composers. Danish composer Per Nørgård, after viewing a Wölfli exhibition in 1979, embarked on a schizoid style lasting for several years; among the works of this time are an opera on the life of Wölfli called The Divine Circus. The chamber opera Wölfli Szenen (Wölfli Scenes), which premiered in Graz, Austria, in 1981, featured music by Georg Friedrich Haas, the Austrian composer of spectral music, Gösta Neuwirth, Anton Prestele and Wolfgang Rihm.

On their web site, The Adolph Wölfli Foundation poses the following question:

Naturally enough, the question whether Wölfli's music can be played is asked again and again. The answer is yes, with some difficulty. Parts of the musical manuscripts of 1913 were analyzed in 1976 by Kjell Keller and Peter Streif and were performed. These are dances – as Wölfli indicates – waltzes, mazurkas, and polkas similar in their melody to folk music. How Wölfli acquired his knowledge of music and its signs and terms is not clear. He heard singing in the village church. Perhaps he himself sang along. There he could see song books from the eighteenth century with six-line staffs (explaining, perhaps, his continuous use of six lines in his musical notations). At festivities he heard dance music, and on military occasions he heard the marches he loved so well. More important than the concrete evaluation of his music notations is Wölfli's concept of viewing and designing his whole oeuvre as a big musical composition. The basic element underlying his compositions and his whole oeuvre is rhythm. Rhythm pervades not only his music but his poems and prose, and there is also a distinctive rhythmic flow in his handwriting.

In 1978, "Adolf Wölfli: Gelesen Und Vertont", the first recording of Wölfli's work ever to be published, was released by the Adolf Wölfli Foundation, Museum of Fine Arts, Bern.  Since that time, a number of German musicians have released adaptations of Wölfli's work. A comprehensive list of these artists can be found at The Adolph Wölfli Foundation's music page.

In 1987, musician and composer Graeme Revell released an LP entitled Necropolis, Amphibians & Reptiles: The Music of Adolf Wolfli. This was on his own Musique Brut label in London, UK in 1987. This audio compilation was based on the works of Wölfli and incorporated digital renditions of Wölfli's compositions, with additional sound effects and ambient soundscapes added to the songs, by Revell, based on the artwork surrounding Wölfli's musical notations. The LP was a collection of musical interpretations by Revell as well as DDAA, & Nurse With Wound. This LP came with a booklet with a biography and images of Wolfli's works. Tracks 8 and 9 are combined into one track. This record was later re-released as The Musique Brut Collection on CD by the Grey Area record label, a sub-label of UK-based Mute Records, under the parent label EMI UK. This audio compilation also includes the other Musique Brut LP release The Insect Musicians. The CD release also contains a small booklet containing pictures of Wölfli's artwork, information about his history, and a brief write-up on Revell's process of converting Wölfli's lithographs into songs.

In 1992, Terry Riley composed and performed a two-hour opera entitled The Saint Adolf Ring based on Wölfli's life.

In 2010, Baudouin De Jaer released a record entitled The Heavenly Ladder with compositions by Wölfli.

Gallery

See also
 Outsider art
 Fractal art
Other outsider artists
 Henry Darger, an outsider artist who independently arrived at his own illustrated semi-autobiographical epic many thousands of pages in length.
 Mark Beyer, a comics artist whose work manifests a similar horror vacui.
 Joseph Cornell

References

Further reading
Écrits d’Art Brut. Graphomanes extravagants, Lucienne Peiry, Paris, Le Seuil, 2020.  
Walter Morgenthaler, Madness & Art, The Life and Works of Adolf Wölfli (Lincoln: University of Nebraska Press, 1992) (= Translation of  Ein Geisteskranker als Künstler). 
 John Maizels, Raw Creation: Outsider Art and Beyond (1996). 
 Elka Spoerri, Daniel Baumann and E. M. Gomez, The Art of Adolf Wolfli (2003).

External links

 Adolf Wölfli Foundation
 Gallery christian berst art brut
 Article on Wölfi from Raw Vision magazine
 Biography of Adolf Wölfli
 Adolf Wolfli website w external links
 The Autobiography of St Adolf II – article on Wölfli from artnet.com, including images of his artwork
 Review of 'The Art of Adolf Wolfli'
A selection of MP3 files from the Gelesen und vertont LP (1978)
The Musique Brut Collection at discogs.com
Adolf Wölfli & Nurse With Wound at Lenka lente

Outsider artists
Artists from Bern
1864 births
1930 deaths
19th-century Swiss painters
Swiss male painters
20th-century Swiss painters
People with schizophrenia
Self-taught artists
19th-century Swiss male artists
20th-century Swiss male artists